Mixed farming is a type of farming which involves both the growing of crops and the raising of livestock.
Such agriculture occurs across Asia and in countries such as India, Malaysia, Indonesia, Afghanistan, South Africa, China, Central Europe, Canada, and Russia. Though at first it mainly served domestic consumption, countries such as the United States and Japan now use it for commercial purposes.

The cultivation of crops alongside the rearing of animals for meat or eggs or milk defines mixed farming.
For example, a mixed farm may grow cereal crops, such as wheat or rye, and also keep cattle, sheep, pigs or poultry. Often the dung from the cattle serves to fertilize the crops. Also some of the crops might be used as fodder for the livestock. Before horses were commonly used for haulage, many young male cattle on such farms were often not butchered as surplus for meat but castrated and used as bullocks to haul the cart and the plough.

See also
 Monoculture
 Working animal
 Cash crop
 Animal husbandry
 Fiber crop
 List of domesticated animals
 Energy crop
 Animal product
 Medicinal plant
 Animal–industrial complex
 Polyculture

Notes

Farms